The Lawson–Woodward theorem is a physics theorem about particle acceleration with electromagnetic wave. This theorem roughly states that an electromagnetic plane wave can not provide a net acceleration to an ultra-relativistic charged particle in vacuum. This is a theoretical limitation to particle acceleration, especially for laser-based electron accelerator. Any laser-based particle accelerator should then break at least one of the hypotheses of the Lawson–Woodward theorem to be physically possible

References 

Physics theorems